Natalia Barbara Czerwonka (born 20 October 1988) is a Polish long track speed skater who participates in international competitions. In 2010, she was awarded the Knight's Cross of the Order of Polonia Restituta.

Olympic Games

At the 2010 Winter Olympics in Vancouver, she was a reserve when the Poland team won a bronze medal in the women's team pursuit. Czerwonka did not receive a medal because she did not participate in any heat, unlike Katarzyna Woźniak, Luiza Złotkowska and Katarzyna Bachleda-Curuś. At the 2014 Winter Olympics in Sochi, she won a silver medal with the same team as four years earlier with the same squad.

Personal records

Career highlights

European Allround Championships
2008 – Kolomna, 17th
World Junior Allround Championships
2006 – Erfurt, 31st
National Championships
2007 – Warszawa,  3rd at 1000 m

References

External links

Czerwonka at Jakub Majerski's Speedskating Database

1988 births
Polish female speed skaters
Speed skaters at the 2010 Winter Olympics
Speed skaters at the 2014 Winter Olympics
Speed skaters at the 2018 Winter Olympics
Speed skaters at the 2022 Winter Olympics
Olympic speed skaters of Poland
Knights of the Order of Polonia Restituta
Sportspeople from Lower Silesian Voivodeship
People from Lubin
Living people
Medalists at the 2014 Winter Olympics
Olympic silver medalists for Poland
Olympic medalists in speed skating
Universiade medalists in speed skating
World Single Distances Speed Skating Championships medalists
Universiade silver medalists for Poland
Universiade bronze medalists for Poland
Competitors at the 2009 Winter Universiade
Competitors at the 2013 Winter Universiade